Governor Sinclair may refer to:

John Sinclair, 1st Baron Pentland (1860–1925), Governor of Madras from 1912 to 1919
Jonathan Sinclair (born 1970), Governor of the Pitcairn, Henderson, Ducie and Oeno Islands from 2014 to 2018